Khasi is an Austroasiatic language with just over a million speakers in north-east India, primarily the Khasi people in the state of Meghalaya. It has associate official status in some districts of this state. The closest relatives of Khasi are the other languages of the Khasic group; these include Pnar, Lyngngam and War.

Khasi is written using the Latin and Bengali-Assamese scripts.

Geographic distribution and status
Khasi is natively spoken by  people in India (as of 2011). There are also small Khasi-speaking communities in neighbouring states of India, the largest of which is in Assam:  people. There is also a very small number of speakers in Bangladesh.

Khasi has been an associate official language of some districts within Meghalaya since 2005, and as of 2012, was no longer considered endangered by UNESCO. There are demands to include this language to the Eighth Schedule to the Constitution of India.

There are a number of books (including novels, poetry, and religious works) as well as newspapers in the Khasi language.  The most famous Khasi poet is U Soso Tham (1873–1940). The online newspaper U Mawphor is published in the Khasi language.

Dialects

Khasi has significant dialectal variation. Some dialects are Pnar, Sohra Khasi, Mylliem Khasi, Mawlai Khasi, Nongkrem Khasi, Bhoi Khasi Nonglung, Maram and War (not the same as the related War language). Bhoi Khasi in Ri Bhoi District, Nongpoh block, and Nonglung in Ri Bhoi District, Umsning block are very different from Standard Khasi, with different word order. They are distinct enough to be sometimes considered separate languages. Sohra and War are lexically very similar.

The Sohra dialect is taken as Standard Khasi as it was the first dialect to be written in Latin and Bengali scripts by the British. Standard Khasi is in turn significantly different from the Shillong dialects (eight at most) which form a dialect continuum across the capital region.

Phonology
This section discusses mainly the phonology of Standard Khasi as spoken in and around the capital city, Shillong.

Khasi, mainly spoken in Meghalaya, is surrounded by unrelated languages: Assamese to the north and east, Bengali to the south (both Indo-Aryan languages), Garo (a Tibeto-Burman language) to the west, and a plethora of other Tibeto-Burman languages including Manipuri, Mizo and Bodo.

Although over the course of time, language change has occurred, Khasi retains some distinctive features:
 Khasi remains a stress language, without tones, unlike many of its Tibeto-Burman neighbors.
Like its Mon-Khmer relatives, Khasi has a large inventory of phonemic vowels (see below)
The syllable structure of Khasi words resembles that of many Mon-Khmer languages, with many lexical items showing a CCVC shape, in which many combinations of consonants are possible in the onset (see examples below).

Consonants

Vowels

Script

Some of the Khasi Syiems of old used to keep official records and communicate with one another on paper primarily using the Bengali script. William Carey wrote the language with the Bengali script between 1813 and 1838. A large number of Khasi books were written in the Bengali script, including the famous book Ka Niyom Jong Ki Khasi or The Religion of the Khasis, which is an important work on the Khasi religion. The Welsh missionary, Thomas Jones, in 1841 wrote the language in the Latin script. As a result, the Latin alphabet of the language has a few similarities with the Welsh alphabet. The first journal in Khasi was U Nongkit Khubor (The Messenger) published at Mawphlang in 1889 by William Williams.

Khasi alphabet
Khasi in Latin script has a different system, distinct from that of English. Khasi uses a 23-letter alphabet by removing the letters c, f, q, v, x and z from the basic Latin alphabet and adding the diacritic letters ï and ñ, and the digraph ng, which is treated as a letter in its own right.

Note
 Vowel length is not usually marked in the orthography, although it can be marked by an acute accent (sim  "bird" vs. sím  "king").
 The peculiar placement of k is due to it replacing c. c and ch were originally used in place of k and kh. When c was removed from the alphabet, k was put in its place.
 The inclusion of g is only due to its presence in the letter ng. It is not used independently in any word of native origin.
 h represents both the fricative sound as well as the glottal stop word-finally.
 y is not pronounced as in year, but acts as a schwa, and as a glottal stop between vowels. The sound in  year is written with ï.

Grammar
Khasi is an Austroasiatic language and has its distinct features of a large number of consonant conjuncts, with prefixing and infixing.

Nouns and noun phrases

Word order
The order of elements in a Khasi noun phrase is
(Case marker)-(Demonstrative)-(Numeral)-(Classifier)-(Article)-Noun-(Adjective)-(Prepositional phrase)-(Relative clause), as can be seen from the following examples:

Gender
Khasi has a pervasive gender system.  There are four genders in this language:

Humans and domestic animals have their natural gender:

 "mother"
  "father"
 "hen"
 "rooster"

Rabel (1961) writes: "the structure of a noun gives no indication of its gender, nor does its meaning, but Khasi natives are of the impression that nice, small creatures and things are feminine while big, ugly creatures and things are masculine....This impression is not borne out by the facts. There are countless examples of desirable and lovely creatures with masculine gender as well as of unpleasant or ugly creatures with feminine gender"

Though there are several counterexamples, Rabel says that there is some semantic regularity in the assignment of gender for the following semantic classes:

The matrilineal aspect of the society can also be observed in the general gender assignment, where so, all central and primary resources associated with day-to-day activities are signified as Feminine; whereas Masculine signifies the secondary, the dependent or the insignificant.

Classifiers
Khasi has a classifier system, apparently used only with numerals.  Between the numeral and noun, the classifier tylli is used for non-humans, and the classifier ngut is used for humans, e.g.

Adjectives
There is some controversy about whether Khasi has a class of adjectives.  Roberts cites examples like the following:

In nearly all instances of attributive adjectives, the apparent adjective has the prefix /ba-/, which seems to be a relativiser.  There are, however, a few adjectives without the /ba-/ prefix:

When the adjective is the main predicate, it may appear without any verb 'be':

In this environment, the adjective is preceded by an agreement marker, like a verb.  Thus it may be that Khasi does not have a separate part of speech for adjectives, but that they are a subtype of verb.

Prepositions and prepositional phrases
Khasi appears to have a well-developed group of prepositions, among them
  "with, and"
  "with (instrumental)"
  "from"
  "in, at"
  "in, at"
  "of"

The following are examples of prepositional phrases:

Verbs and verb phrases

Agreement
Verbs agree with 3rd person subjects in gender, but there is no agreement for non-3rd persons (Roberts 1891):

The masculine and feminine markers /u/ and /ka/ are used even when there is a noun phrase subject (Roberts 1891:132):

Tense marking
Tense is shown through a set of particles that appear after the agreement markers but before the verb. Past is a particle /la/ and future is /yn/ (contracted to 'n after a vowel):

Negation
Negation is also shown through a particle, /ym/ (contracted to 'm after a vowel), which appears between the agreement and the tense particle.  There is a special past negation particle /shym/ in the past which replaces the ordinary past /la/ (Roberts 1891):

Copulas
The copula is an ordinary verb in Khasi, as in the following sentence:

Causative verbs
Khasi has a morphological causative /pn-/ (Rabel 1961). (This is spelled pyn in Roberts (1891)):

Sentences

Word order
Word order in simple sentences is subject–verb–object (SVO):

However, VSO order is also found, especially after certain initial particles, like hangta 'then' (Rabel 1961).

Case marking
Sometimes the object is preceded by a particle ya (spelled ia in Roberts 1891).  Roberts says "ia, 'to', 'for', 'against' implies direct and immediate relation.  Hence its being the sign of the dative and of the accusative case as well"

It appears from Roberts (1891) that Khasi has differential object marking, since only some objects are marked accusative.  Roberts notes that nouns that are definite usually have the accusative and those that are indefinite often do not.

Rabel (1961) says "the use of ïa is optional in the case of one object.  In the case of two objects one of them must have ïa preceding.... If one of the objects is expressed by a pronoun, it must be preceded by ïa."

Broadly speaking, Khasi marks for eight cases, with the nominative case remaining unmarked, for a total of nine cases.

Passive
Khasi has a passive, but it involves removing the agent of the sentence without putting the patient in subject position.  (A type called the 'non-ascensional passive').  Compare the following active-passive pair (Roberts 1891) where the patient continues to have accusative case and remains in the object position:

This type of passive is used, even when the passive agent is present in a prepositional phrase:

Questions
Yes-no questions seem to be distinguished from statements only by intonation:

Wh-questions don't involve moving the wh-element:

Embedded clauses
Subordinate clauses follow the main verb that selects them (Roberts 1891:169):

Relative clauses follow the nouns that they modify and agree in gender:

Sample text in Khasi

Article 1 of the Universal Declaration of Human Rights
Khasi Alphabet

Ïa ki bynriew baroh la kha laitluid bad ki ïaryngkat ha ka burom bad ki hok. Ha ki la bsiap da ka bor pyrkhat bad ka jingïatiplem bad ha ka mynsiem jingsngew shipara, ki dei ban ïatrei bynrap lang.

(Jinis 1 jong ka Jingpynbna-Ïar Satlak ïa ki Hok Longbriew-Manbriew)

Assamese script
যা কি বৃনৰ‌্যের বাৰহ লা খা লাচলোছ বাড কী যৰূঙ্কট হা কি বুৰম বাড ক হক. হাকি লা বৃস্যপ দা ক বৰ-পৃৰ্খট বাড ক চিংযাতিপলেম বাড হা ক মৃন্স্যেম চিংস্ঙেউ শীপাৰা, কী দেই বাণ যত্ৰেই বৃনৰাপ লাং.

(জিনিস বানৃঙ্গং জং ক চিংপৃনবৃনা-যাৰ সত্লাক যা কি হক লংব্ৰ্যের-মানব্র্যের.)

IPA

jaː ki bɨnreʊ baːrɔʔ laː kʰaː lacloc bat ki jaːrɨŋkat haː kaː burɔm bat ki hɔk. haː ki laː bsjap daː kaː bɔːr pɨrkʰat bat kaː dʒɪŋjaːtɪplɛm bat haː kaː mɨnseːm dʒɨŋsŋɛʊ ʃiparaː ki dɛɪ ban jaːtrɛɪ bɨnrap laŋ

(dʒinɪs banɨŋkɔŋ dʒɔŋ kaː dʒɨŋpɨnbnaː-jaːr satlak jaː ki hɔk lɔŋbreʊ manbreʊ)

Gloss

To the human all are born free and they equal in the dignity and the rights. In them are endowed with the power thought and the conscience and in the spirit feeling fraternity they should to work assist together.

(Article first of the Declaration Universal of the Rights Humanity)

Translation

All human beings are born free and equal in dignity and rights. They are endowed with reason and conscience and should work towards each other in a spirit of brotherhood.

Basic vocabulary

Numbers

References

Sources
 Nagaraja, K. S. 1985. Khasi – A Descriptive Analysis. Poona: Deccan College Postgraduate Research Institute.
 Pryse, William. 1855. An Introduction to the Khasia Language. (Reproduced 1988)
 Rabel, Lili. 1961. Khasi, a Language of Assam. Baton Rouge, La: Louisiana State University Press.
 Rabel-Heymann. 1977. "Gender in Khasi nouns".  Journal of Mon-Khmer Studies 6:247–272
 Roberts, H. 1891. A Grammar of the Khassi Language. For the use of schools, native students, officers and English residents. London: Kegan Paul, Trench, Trübner.
 Singh, Nissor. 1906. Khasi-English Dictionary.  Shillong: Eastern Bengal and Assam State Secretariat Press.

Further reading
 2006-e. Khasi. In E. K. Brown (ed.) Encyclopedia of Languages and Linguistics. Oxford: Elsevier Press.

External links

 Online Khasi literature
 Entry for Khasi at the Language Information Service of India
 The World Atlas of Language Structures Online: Khasi
 Resource Center for Indian Language Technology Solutions: Khasi
 Khasi to English Vocabulary
 Basic words and phrases in Khasi language

Khasian languages
Languages of Bangladesh
Languages of India
Languages of Meghalaya